Formula One, abbreviated to F1, is the highest class of open-wheeled auto racing defined by the Fédération Internationale de l'Automobile (FIA), motorsport's world governing body. The "formula" in the name alludes to a series of rules established by the FIA to which all participants and vehicles are required to conform. Constructors are awarded points based on the finishing position of each of their two drivers at each Grand Prix, and the constructor who accumulates the most points over each championship is crowned that year's World Constructors' Champion. As of the 2023 Saudi Arabian Grand Prix, there have been 171 Formula One constructors who have raced at least one of the 1,081 FIA World Championship races since the first such event, the 1950 British Grand Prix.

Constructors are people or corporate entities which design key parts of Formula One cars that have competed or are intended to compete in the FIA World Championship. Since 1981, it has been a requirement that each competitor must have the exclusive rights to the use of certain key parts of their car – in 2018, these parts were the survival cell, the front impact structure, the roll structures and bodywork.

Ferrari holds the record for the most Constructors' and Drivers' Championships won with sixteen and fifteen, respectively.

Terminology
In Formula One racing the terms "constructor" and "entrant" have specific and differing meanings. An entrant is the person or corporate entity that registers a car and driver for a race, and is then responsible for preparing and maintaining that car during the race weekend. As a result of this preparation role and active involvement in the running of the race, the term "team" has become commonly applied to an entrant organisation. Statisticians do not always agree on how to count statistics related to these entities.

Constructors

Under Article 6.3 of the FIA Sporting Regulations, "A constructor is the person (including any corporate or unincorporated body) which designs the Listed Parts set out in Appendix 6. The make of an engine or chassis is the name attributed to it by its constructor." These "listed parts" include the survival cell, the front impact structure, the roll structures and bodywork. However, if the chassis and engine are made by different entities, the constructor comprises both (e.g. McLaren-Mercedes, Lotus-Climax etc.), with the name of the chassis constructor being placed before that of the engine constructor. As both chassis and engine are included in the constructor name, chassis run with different engines are counted as two separate constructors and score points separately. This occurred for the last time in the  season when the Tyrrell team ran their chassis powered by both Ford and Renault engines, scored points with both engines and thus finishing 9th as Tyrrell-Ford and 10th as Tyrrell-Renault in the World Constructors' Championship. 

Under article 6.2 of the FIA sporting regulations, "The title of Formula One World Champion Constructor will be awarded to the competitor which has scored the highest number of points". From the inaugural season of the World Constructors' Championship in  up until the  season only the highest-scoring driver in each race for each constructor contributed points towards the World Constructors' Championship (then officially as the International Cup for Formula One Constructors ); since the  season points from all cars entered by each constructor have counted towards their championship total.

Teams
Since the  season the FIA have required that Formula One entrants own the intellectual rights to the chassis that they enter, and so the distinction between the terms "entrant" and "constructor", and hence also "team", have become less pronounced, though the intellectual rights of engines may still be owned by a different entity. That season also saw the International Cup for Formula One Constructors be officially renamed to the World Constructors' Championship.

Before this time, constructors were free to sell their chassis to as many other teams as they liked. Brabham and Lotus chassis were used extensively by other teams during the 1960s and 1970s and several quite competitive privateer teams never built their own chassis. Rob Walker Racing Team was the most successful example, being responsible for the first victories in Formula One for both Cooper and Lotus. The concept of a "works" or "factory" team (i.e. the official team of the company producing the cars, as opposed to a customer team which buys them off the shelf) therefore applied to chassis in the same way as it does in rallying and sports car racing.

There have been some recent exceptions where a specialist company, not itself entered in the championship, has been commissioned to design and build a chassis for a team; Lola built cars for Larrousse and Scuderia Italia in the late 1980s and early 1990s, for example. Larousse had their points from the  season erased after the FIA decided that they had falsely nominated themselves and not Lola as the chassis constructor. In , the new Arrows team which had been established by former Shadow personnel was sued by Shadow on the grounds that the Arrows FA/1 car was a copy of Shadow's DN9 – a view upheld by the UK High Court, which placed a ban on Arrows racing the FA/1.

There have been more recent cases with Ligier (1995), Sauber (2004), Scuderia Toro Rosso (2006–2007) and Super Aguri (2007–2008) where teams have been accused of using a chassis produced by another constructor (respectively Benetton, Ferrari, Red Bull Racing and Honda). No action was taken against any of these teams, the sporting authorities being satisfied in each case that the team owned the intellectual property to the chassis they raced.

From the middle of the  season until the end of the  season, each team had permanent racing numbers from race to race throughout the season. Between  and  the numbers were based on the teams' finishing positions in the 1973 Constructors' Championship (with slight modifications, e.g. Ferrari's traditional numbers were 11–12 until  and 27–28 from  onwards) and each team only changed numbers if they had the driver who had won the World Drivers' Championship in the previous season – the winning driver taking the number 1 and his teammate the number 2, and the team that had previously had those numbers switching to the newly-vacated ones. Between  and  the numbers were based on the teams' finishing positions in the Constructors' Championship from the previous season, with numbers 1 and 2 assigned to the defending champion and his teammate. During the period of 1974–1995 Tyrrell was the only team to keep the same numbers (3 and 4) every season. Since , racing numbers have been assigned to drivers instead of teams.

The number of cars entered by one team into a single race was not strictly limited in the 1950s and early 1960s. Since the  season teams were generally allowed to enter only two regular cars, with the third car reserved for an occasional driver. This rule was further promoted since the  season by the assignment of the permanent racing numbers to each team in pairs, with the third car having the racing number out of the pair. However, many teams during this period entered only two cars, e.g. Ferrari have entered no more than two cars (with one exception at the 1976 Italian Grand Prix in connection with Lauda's comeback) every season since . Since the  season the FIA have required that teams enter no more than two cars for a race.

Team's nationality
Unlike drivers who are required to compete in the FIA Formula One World Championship under the nationality of their passport, the FIA's International Sporting Code states that teams competing in the FIA Formula One World Championship shall compete under the nationality of their parent National Automobile Club that issued their FIA racing licence. On the basis of this regulation, despite the fact that most current teams are based in the UK, this country is officially represented in Formula One only by teams holding a racing licence issued by the British National Sporting Authority. Teams take the nationality of their parent National Automobile Club that issued their licence for the period of validity of that licence and the change of the nationality is allowed. Several teams changed their nationality during their competition in Formula One, some of them even twice (e.g. At the 1997 German Grand Prix Benetton became the only team to have achieved victories while racing under two different nationalities. Before the arrival of sponsorship liveries in the  season team's nationality determined the colour of a car entered by the team; thus, Italian teams' cars were rosso corsa red, French were bleu de France blue, and British (with several exceptions, such as Rob Walker, Brabham and McLaren) were British racing green.

Relating to the team's nationality because of teams' bases in Britain several mistakes occurred on official entry lists issued by or podium ceremonies organized by the FIA or race organisers, e.g. Wolf holding the Canadian nationality and Shadow (in ) and Penske holding the American nationality all identified as the British by official entry lists, or the British national anthem played on the podium in honour of the winning Jordan and Red Bull (in ) holding the Irish and Austrian nationality respectively.

Constructors for the 2023 season
Correct as of the 
Note: Until  a works team of every constructor was licensed in the country where it was really based. Since the early 2000s most teams have been based in the United Kingdom, but licensed in another country, with the rest based in Italy (Maranello and Faenza) and Switzerland (Hinwil).

Key:

Former constructors 

Key:

Indianapolis 500 only
The following are constructors whose only participation was in the Indianapolis 500 from 1950 to 1960 when the race was part of the Formula One World Drivers' Championship. All were based in the United States.

 Adams
 Bromme
 Christensen
 Deidt
 Del Roy
 Dunn
 Elder
 Epperly
 Ewing
 Hall
 Kuzma
 Langley
 Lesovsky
 Marchese
 Meskowski
 Moore
 Nichels
 Olson
 Pankratz
 Pawl
 Phillips
 Rae
 Schroeder
 Sherman
 Snowberger
 Stevens
 Sutton
 Trevis
 Turner
 Watson
 Wetteroth

Privateer teams 
The following are privateer teams which never built their own chassis, and thus were not "constructors":

  AE Moss
  Bernard White Racing (–)
  BMS Scuderia Italia (–)
  British Formula One Racing Team
  BS Fabrications (–)
  Camoradi International (–)
  DW Racing Enterprises (–)
  Ecurie Belge (–)
   (–)
  Ecurie Bonnier (–, –)
  Ecurie Ecosse (–)
  Ecurie Espadon (–)
  Ecurie Lutetia
  Ecurie Maarsbergen (–)
  Ecurie Rosier (–)
  Enrico Platé (–)
  Equipe Moss
  Escuderia Bandeirantes (–)
  FISA
  FR Gerard Cars (–, –, –)
  Goldie Hexagon Racing
  John Willment Automobiles (–)
  Juan Manuel Fangio
  Matra International (–)
  Mecom Racing Team
  North American Racing Team (–)
   (–)
  Reg Parnell Racing (–)
  Rob Walker Racing Team (–, –)
  Scuderia Achille Varzi
  Scuderia Ambrosiana (–)
  Scuderia Centro Sud (–, –)
  Scuderia Filipinetti (–)
  Scuderia Sant'Ambroeus
  Scuderia Sud Americana
  Silvio Moser Racing Team (–)
  T.A.S.O. Mathieson
  Team Gunston (–, –, –)

Privateer teams by number of wins 

* All constructor's wins
** First win for the constructor
*** Team's only championship race

See also 

 List of Formula One World Constructors' Champions
 List of Formula One Grand Prix winners (constructors)
 List of automobile manufacturers

Notes

Bibliography

References
General
 
 
 
 

Specific

External links 
 Formula One official website
 FIA official website

 
Constructors